The Chilla-Kimsa Chata mountain range (also spelled Kimsachata, Aymara and Quechua kimsa three, Pukina chata mountain, "three mountains", Hispanicized spellings Quimsachata, Quimsa Chata) is situated in Bolivia south east of Wiñaymarka Lake, the southern part of Lake Titicaca, in the La Paz Department, Ingavi Province. The range is named after one of highest mountains, the Kimsa Chata complex rising up to  about 15 km south of  Tiwanaku.

The range stretches from north to south-east almost parallel to the Taraco range north of it. Wakira River flows through the valley between the two ranges and Jach'a Jawira flows along its southern slopes.

Mountains 
Some of the highest elevations of the range are listed below.

References

Chilla Kimsa Chata